The Darwin River Dam is in Australia's Northern Territory on the Darwin River. The water catchment it contains is the major source for the city of Darwin.

The dam can hold up to 259,000 megalitres of water which is half the volume in Sydney Harbour or eleven times bigger than the Manton Dam.

The Darwin River Dam is an embankment-type dam. It is ungated with no spillway regulation possible. The dam relies on the annual wet season to be replenished. Toward the end of this season, the dam sometimes overflows. Most years spilling occurs, and is considered normal. Depending on rainfall amounts, this overflow can last from days to weeks.

The water in this dam is considered to be one of the most pristine on Earth. In order to preserve this quality, the catchment and reservoir policy prohibits recreational use with substantial penalties imposed for trespassing. Also, there is no Cabomba, an aquatic weed genus that can affect water quality.

The dam was formally opened by William McMahon (Prime Minister at the time) on 29 June 1972. The cost of construction was $9 million.

See also
 Irrigation in Australia
 List of dams and reservoirs in Australia

References

External links
 
Information about current water levels in the Darwin River Dam catchment

Dams in the Northern Territory
Dams completed in 1972
1972 establishments in Australia
Darwin, Northern Territory